Dan Berg í Soylu (born 9 July 1996) is a Faroese footballer who plays as a midfielder for HB and the Faroe Islands national team.

Career
Soylu made his international debut for Faroe Islands on 3 September 2020 in the UEFA Nations League against Malta, coming on as a substitute in the 65th minute for Meinhard Olsen, with the match finishing as a 3–2 home win.

Career statistics

International

References

External links
 
 
 
 Dan í Soylu at FaroeSoccer

1996 births
Living people
Faroese footballers
Faroe Islands youth international footballers
Faroe Islands under-21 international footballers
Faroe Islands international footballers
Association football midfielders
B71 Sandoy players
Argja Bóltfelag players
EB/Streymur players
Havnar Bóltfelag players
Faroe Islands Premier League players
1. deild players